The 1921 DePauw Tigers football team was an American football team that represented DePauw University as an independent during the 1921 college football season. Under first-year head coach Fred "Mysterious" Walker, the team compiled a 4–3 record and outscored opponents by a total of 167 to 107. Its losses included games against Knute Rockne's Notre Dame and Robert Zuppke's Illinois teams. 

The team played its home games at McKeen Field in Greencastle, Indiana. Enrollment at DePauw in 1921 was approximately 1,200 students.

Schedule

References

DePauw
DePauw Tigers football seasons
DePauw football